The 1986 WCT Scottsdale Open was a men's WCT and Nabisco Grand Prix tennis tournament played on outdoor hard courts in Scottsdale, Arizona in the United States. It was the inaugural edition of the tournament and was held from October 6 through October 13, 1986. First-seeded John McEnroe won the singles title.

Finals

Singles

 John McEnroe defeated  Kevin Curren 6–3, 3–6, 6–2
 It was McEnroe's 3rd singles title of the year and the 70th of his career.

Doubles

 Leonardo Lavalle /  Mike Leach defeated  Scott Davis /  David Pate 7–6, 6–4
 It was Lavalle's only title of the year and the 1st of his career. It was Leach's 3rd title of the year and the 3rd of his career.

See also
 1986 Virginia Slims of Arizona – women's tournament in Phoenix

References

External links 
 ITF tournament edition details

 
WCT Scottsdale Open
WCT Scottsdale Open
WCT Scottsdale Open
Tennis Channel Open